The Prešov Region, also Priashiv Region is one of the eight Slovak administrative regions and consists of 13 districts (okresy) and 666 municipalities, 23 of which have town status. The region was established in 1996 and is the most populous of all the regions in Slovakia. Its administrative center is the city of Prešov.

Geography
It is located in the north-eastern Slovakia and has an area of 8,975 km2. The region has a predominantly mountainous landscape. The subdivisions of Tatras – High Tatras and Belianske Tatras lie almost entirely in the region and include the highest point of Slovakia – Gerlachovský štít (2,654 ASL). Other mountain ranges and highlands in the region are Šarišská vrchovina, Čergov, Ondavská vrchovina, Slanské vrchy, Pieniny, Levoča Hills, Laborecká vrchovina, Bukovské vrchy, Vihorlat Mountains and Eastern Slovak Lowland. The basins in Prešov Region are Podtatranská kotlina, Hornadská kotlina and Košice Basin.

Major rivers in the region include the Poprad in the west, which is the only major Slovak river in the Baltic Sea watershed, a small part of Hornád in the south-west, a small part of Dunajec in the north, the Torysa in the centre and the Ondava and Laborec in the east. As for administrative divisions, the region borders on the Lesser Poland and Subcarpathian voivodeships in Poland in the north, Zakarpattia Oblast of Ukraine in the east, Košice Region in the south, Banská Bystrica Region in the south-west and Žilina Region in the west.

Demographics

The largest towns are Prešov, Poprad, Humenné, Bardejov and Snina. According to the 2011 census, there were 814,527 inhabitants in the region, with a majority of Slovaks (90.7%), with minorities of Roma (4.0%), Rusyns (2.7%) and there are small minorities of Ukrainians (<1%) and Czechs (<0.5%).

Politics
Current governor of Prešov region is Milan Majerský (KDH). He won with 42,0 %. In election 2017 was elected also regional parliament :

Administrative division
The Prešov Region consists of 13 districts. There are 666 municipalities, of which 23 are towns, where about half of the region's population live.

List of districts
Bardejov
Humenné
Kežmarok
Levoča
Medzilaborce
Poprad
Prešov
Sabinov
Snina
Stará Ľubovňa
Stropkov
Svidník
Vranov nad Topľou

See also
 Spiš
 Šariš
 Zemplín
 Union of Carpathian Youth

References

Further reading

External links

 Prešovský samosprávny kraj Official website

 
Regions of Slovakia
Rusyn communities